Rykiel is a surname. Notable people with the surname include:

Jean-Philippe Rykiel (born 1961), French composer, arranger & musician
Sonia Rykiel (1930–2016), French fashion designer and writer